The New Shmoo is an American animated television series based on the character from the Li'l Abner comic strip created by Al Capp, produced by Hanna-Barbera Productions and broadcast on NBC from September 22, 1979 to November 15, 1980.

The New Shmoo was broadcast as a stand-alone half-hour series from September 22 to December 1, 1979. Beginning December 8, 1979, the remaining five episodes of The New Shmoo were now incorporated into the 90-minute package show Fred and Barney Meet the Shmoo which also featured combined reruns of Fred and Barney Meet the Thing. Despite the show's title, Fred, Barney, the Thing, and Shmoo only met each other in brief bumpers between their individual segments.

Plot
Similar to Scooby-Doo, Where Are You! on CBS and later ABC, the show follows a group of teenagers—Mickey, Nita, and Billy Joe—who solve mysteries and crimes with their friend, Shmoo, a friendly bulbous creature who can stretch and shape his body into any form he wants. The teens worked for Mighty Mysteries Comics.

Production
During the original NBC run, the program included a short segment called "Sing Along With The Shmoo". In a manner reminiscent of Screen Songs, Shmoo became a bouncing ball, providing visual guidance to song lyrics so that viewers could sing along with the cartoon.

Cast
 Frank Welker as Shmoo
 Dolores Cantu as Nita
 Bill Idelson as Mickey
 Chuck McCann as Billy Joe
 Additional voices: Joe Baker, Daws Butler, Bob Hastings, Don Messick, Jim MacGeorge, Margaret McIntyre, Ginny McSwain, Hal Smith, John Stephenson, Janet Waldo, Bill Woodson

Episodes

1 These episodes were incorporated into the 90-minute package show Fred and Barney Meet the Shmoo.

Broadcast history
The New Shmoo originally aired in these following formats on NBC:

The New Shmoo (September 22, 1979 – December 1, 1979)
Fred and Barney Meet the Shmoo (December 8, 1979 – November 15, 1980)

Production credits
 Executive Producers: William Hanna and Joseph Barbera
 Producers: Alex Lovy and Art Scott
 Directors: Ray Patterson, Carl Urbano, Oscar Dufau, George Gordon
 Story Supervisor: Jim Ryan
 Story Editor: Chuck Menville
 Story: Gene Ayres, Doug Booth, Art Browne, Jr., Buzz Dixon, Donald F. Glut, Len Janson, Dale Kirby, Glenn Leopold, Chuck Menville, J. Michael Reaves, Jim Ryan
 Story Direction: Don Christensen, Jan Green
 Recording Director: Art Scott
 Voices: Joe Baker, Daws Butler, Bob Hastings, Bill Idelson, Don Messick, Chuck McCann, Jim MacGeorge, Margaret McIntyre, Ginny McSwain, Dolores Cantu-Primo, Hal Smith, John Stephenson, Janet Waldo, Frank Welker, Bill Woodson
 Graphics: Iraj Paran, Tom Wogatzke
 Title Design: Don Sheppard
 Musical Director: Hoyt Curtin
 Musical Supervisor: Paul DeKorte
 Creative Producer: Iwao Takamoto
 Design Supervisor: Bob Singer
 Character Design: Jack Kirby, Don Morgan, Mike Sekowsky, Sandra Young
 Layout Supervisor: Don Morgan
 Key Layout: Mark Kirkland
 Layout: Kurt Anderson, Tom Bird, Aaron Crippen, Bob Foster, Linda Harris, Mike Hodgson, Ray Jacobs, Allen Larson, Jim McLean, Phil Ortiz, Glenn Schmitz, Dave Stevens
 Animation Supervisors: Bob Goe, Bill Keil, Jay Sarbry, Ken Southworth
 Animation: Robert Alvarez, Frank Andrina, Colin Baker, Anne Marie Bardwell, Ed Barge, Bob Bemiller, Robert Bransford, James Brummett, Oliver Callahan, Roger Chiasson, John Conning, Daniel De La Vega, Joan Drake, Judith Ann Drake, Gail Finkeldei, Hugh Fraser, Al Gaivoto, Jeff Hall, Bob Hathcock, Fred Hellmich, Bill Hutten, Aundre Knuston, Teresa Loewy, Hicks Lokey, Tony Love, Mauro Maressa, Burton Medall, Tran Vu Minh, Ken Muse, Eduardo Olivares, Margaret Parkes, Lester Pegues, Jr., Harry Rasmussen, Morey Reden, Joel Seibel, Leo Sullivan, Richard Trueblood, Robert Tyler, John Walker, Allen Wilzbach
 Assistant Animation Supervisor: Rick Leon
 Background Supervisor: Al Gmuer
 Backgrounds: Lorraine Andrina, Fernando Arce, Greg Battes, Dario Campanile, Gil Dicicco, Dennis Durrell, Fla Ferreira, Martin Forte, Bob Gentle, Bonnie Goodknight, Al Gmuer, Ann Guenther, Tom Hames, James Hegedus, Eric Heschong, Jim Hickey, Mike Humphries, Andy Phillipson, Bill Proctor, Viviven Rhyan, Jeff Richards, Cal Titus, Dennis Veinzelos
 Checking and Scene Planning: Cindy Smith
 Xerography: Star Wirth
 Ink and Paint Supervisor: Alison Victory
 Sound Direction: Richard Olson, Bill Getty
 Camera: Ross Avery, Bob Berry, Allen Childs, Marc Debrilande, Candy Edwards, Curt Hall, Mike Kane, Jerry Mills, Neil Viker, Roy Wade, Brandy Whittington, Jerry Whittington
 Supervising Film Editor: Larry C. Cowan
 Dubbing Supervisor: Pat Foley
 Music Editor: Terry Moore
 Effects Editors: Mark Mangini, Karla McGregor
 Show Editor: Gil Iverson
 Negative Consultant: William E. DeBoer
 Production Manager: Jayne Barbera
 Post Production Supervisor: Joed Eaton

See also
Fred and Barney Meet the Shmoo

References

External links

Fred and Barney Meet the Shmoo at the Big Cartoon DataBase

1979 American television series debuts
1980 American television series endings
1970s American animated television series
1980s American animated television series
American animated television spin-offs
American children's animated comedy television series
American children's animated mystery television series
American children's animated fantasy television series
NBC original programming
Li'l Abner
Teen animated television series
Television series by Hanna-Barbera
English-language television shows